Cyprien may refer to:

 , a 2009 film with Catherine Deneuve
 , a masculine given name
 Tropical Storm Cyprien, a short-lived tropical cyclone

People 
 Glynn Cyprien, American basketball coach
 Jean-Pierre Cyprien, former French footballer 
 Johnathan Cyprien, American football strong safety
 Wylan Cyprien, French professional footballer
 Cyprien Iov, French comedian, actor, dubber, and blogger

See also 
 Saint-Cyprien (disambiguation)